NU 107 Cebu is a defunct FM station of Progressive Broadcasting Corporation and current internet radio station in the Philippines. The station's studio & transmitter is located at Labangon, Cebu City.

See also 
NU 107
DWAO-TV
NU Rock Awards

Progressive Broadcasting Corporation
Radio stations in Metro Cebu
Modern rock radio stations in the Philippines
Radio stations established in 1992
Internet radio stations in the Philippines